The 1979–80 season was Real Madrid Club de Fútbol's 78th season in existence and the club's 49th consecutive season in the top flight of Spanish football.

Summary
During summer changes came to the bench, Real Zaragoza's Yugoslavian head coach Vujadin Boskov signed in to replace Luis Molowny as new trainer. After the departure of Danish Forward Henning Jensen to Ajax Amsterdam, the club seek to reinforce the left side, rumours included several players such as René van de Kerkhof from PSV Eindhoven and Rüdiger Abramczik from Schalke 04, however the manager favoured the arrival of Laurie Cunningham who became the first British player to play for the club, the forward was transferred in from West Bromwich Albion. Defender Goyo Benito received La Laureada (The Laureate) from President Luis de Carlos due to his outstanding compromise and playing for the club being only one of two players with that distinction. Other two players reinforced "The Madrid of Los García" such as Perez García from Real Madrid Castilla and Antonio García Navajas from Burgos CF. 

In the European Cup, the team reached the semi-finals where it was eliminated by Western German side Hamburg SV. Despite winning 2–0 in Madrid, the squad plummeted in the second leg of the series to lose 1–5. Meanwhile, in the 1979–80 Copa del Rey the squad advanced to the final and won the trophy against its reserve team Real Madrid Castilla 6–1 in front of 65,000 spectators at the Santiago Bernabéu Stadium.

The club clinched its 20th League title which became its third three-peat ever by just one single point above runners-up emerging Real Sociedad after the then-undefeated in last 38 league matches basque side lost its game on round 32 against Sevilla thanks to 2 goals of Daniel Bertoni. Added to its Copa del Rey trophy, the team won its third "Double" ever.

Squad

Transfers

Competitions

La Liga

Position by round

League table

Matches

Copa del Rey

Final

European Cup

First round

Round of 16

Quarter-finals

Semi-finals

Statistics

Players statistics

See also
The Madrid of los Garcia (in Spanish)

References

External links
 BDFútbol

Real Madrid CF seasons
Spanish football championship-winning seasons
Real Madrid